Mary Karl may refer to:
 Mary Brennan Karl, American educator 
 Mary Cordia Karl, American mathematician